Langerman is a surname. It is the surname of:
Jean and Jo Langerman, American twin professional women's basketball players for the All-American Red Heads
John Langerman, Mayflower passenger, servant of Christopher Martin (Mayflower passenger)
Stefan Langerman, Belgian mathematician and computer scientist
Tebogo Langerman (born 1986), South African footballer